Shinboku-con was an annual four-day anime convention held during April at the Sawmill Creek Resort in Huron, Ohio.

Programming
The convention typically offers anime showings, cosplay contest, dances, panels, professional wrestling, trading card tournaments, vendors/artist room, and video game tournaments.

History
Shinboku-con was founded in 2007 by members of the Lorain County Community College Anime Society and Roleplayer's Association. In 2010 the convention became a three-day event, and had its first industry guest, Tiffany Grant. In 2011 three attendees were arrested at the convention, two men were involved in a dispute over the playing of a video game which resulted in a punch to the mouth and an officer being spit on.  Another man was arrested for an incident involving the damage of hotel property and underage consumption of alcohol. The convention expanded to a partial fourth day in 2014. Shinboku-con cancelled their 2015 event.

Event history

References

Defunct anime conventions
Recurring events established in 2007
Recurring events disestablished in 2014
2007 establishments in Ohio
Annual events in Ohio
Festivals in Ohio